Hurricane Katrina has been featured in a number of works of fiction (as well as non-fiction). This article is an ongoing effort to list the many artworks, books, comics, movies, popular songs, and television shows that feature Hurricane Katrina as an event in the plot.

Books: Fiction, including short story collections

Buddy by M.H. Herlong
 Hurricane by Jewell Parker Rhodes
 Down in the Flood by Kenneth Abel
 'The Floating World by C. Morgan Babst
 ‘’I survived: Hurricane Katrina 2005’’ by Lauren Tarshis
 Nine Lives: Death and Life in New Orleans by Dan Baum
 Revacuation by Brad Benischek
 Blink of an Eye by Rexanne Becnel
 Babylon Rolling by Amanda Boyden
 Jesus Out to Sea by James Lee Burke
 The Tin Roof Blowdown: A Dave Robicheaux Novel by James Lee Burke
 Storm Surge: A Novel of Hurricane Katrina by Ramsey Coutta
 "The Passage" by Justin Cronin
 First The Dead: A Bug Man Novel by Tim Downs
 Tubby Meets Katrina by Tony Dunbar
 Lost and Betrayed (An American Tale): A Fictional Tale of Hurricane Katrina by Sly Fleming
 A Little Bit Ruined by Patty Friedmann
 Taken Away by Patty Friedmann
 Map Of Moments by Christopher Golden and Tim Lebbon
 Darker Angels by MLN Hanover
 All Together Dead by Charlaine Harris
 Murder in the Rue Chartres by Greg Herren
 What Remained of Katrina: A Novel of New Orleans by Kelly Jameson 
 Hurricane Katrina--What Really Happened by Nathaniel Jones
 Life in the Wake: Fiction from Post-Katrina New Orleans by the writers of NOLAFugees.com
 City of Refuge by Tom Piazza
 Rooftop Diva: A Novel of Triumph After Katrina by D. T. Pollard
 Misisipi by Michael Reilly
 Ninth Ward by Jewell Parker Rhodes (adolescent literature)
 One D.O.A.,  One on the Way by Mary Robison
 1 Dead in Attic by Chris Rose
 "Slab" by Selah Saterstrom
 New Orleans Noir edited by Julie Smith
 Last Known Victim by Erica Spindler
 Voodoo Storm: Hurricane Katrina, Death and Mystery in New Orleans by Davis Temple
 Dogs Gone Wild: After Hurricane Katrina by Theresa D. Thompson
 Hurricane Song by Paul Volponi
 Salvage the Bones by Jesmyn Ward
 Playing the Angel by Kenneth Womack
 Aftermath--Corruption and Intrigue in Post Katrina New Orleans by Charles Williams
 Katrina and the Animals by Taiwo Odunsi

Books: Non-fiction

 Heart Like Water: Surviving Katrina and Life in Its Disaster Zone by Joshua Clark
 Zeitoun by Dave Eggers
 Five Days at Memorial: Life and Death in a Storm-Ravaged Hospital by Sheri Fink
 Pawprints of Katrina by Cathy Scott, foreword by Ali MacGraw, photos by Clay Myers

Comic books and graphic novels 

 Bloodthirsty: One Nation Under Water by Mark Landry, Ashley Witter, and Richard Pace
 A.D.: New Orleans After the Deluge by Josh Neufeld
 The Parish: An AmeriCorps Story by Joel E.R. Smith and Ryan Winet

Films

 Bad Lieutenant: Port of Call New Orleans (2009)
 Beasts of the Southern Wild (2012)
Cut Throat City (2020)
 Déjà Vu (2006)
 Hours (2013)
 Hurricane Season (2010)
 If God Is Willing and Da Creek Don't Rise (2010)
 Streets of Blood (2009)
 The American Can (2011) announced
 The Curious Case of Benjamin Button (2008)
 Trouble the Water (2008)
 Waters Rising (2007), features criminal brothers from the Desire Projects, whose lives are profoundly impacted by Hurricane Katrina and their evacuation to Houston, Texas
 When the Levees Broke: A Requiem in Four Acts (2006)

Music

 "Madman's Dream" by Assemblage 23, from his 2007 album Meta
 "My sanctuary" by Marc Cohn, from his 2007 album Join the Parade
 "Blue Monday" by Alexis Dean (aka Skillbill), is a 2005 song about Katrina
 "This City" by Steve Earle, from his 2011 album I'll Never Get Out of This World Alive
 "Minority Report" by Jay-Z Feat. Ne-Yo, from his 2006 album Kingdom Come
 "The Little Things Give You Away" by Linkin Park, from their 2007 album Minutes to Midnight (album)
 "Nights" by Frank Ocean, from his 2016 album Blonde (Frank Ocean album)
 "New Orleans" by Rancid, from their 2009 album Let The Dominoes Fall
 "We Stay Behind" by Rasputina, from their 2007 album Oh Perilous World
 "God Forsaken Town" by Reckless Kelly, from their 2008 album Bulletproof
 The first verse of "Help is on the Way" by Rise Against, from their 2011 album Endgame
 "Pontchartrain" by Vienna Teng, from her 2006 album Dreaming Through the Noise
 "O Katrina!" by The Black Lips, from their 2007 album Good Bad Not Evil

Television series

 American Crime Story, FX (Season 3)
Bones, FOX (2006) (Season 1, Episode 19) ("The Man in the Morgue")
 Boston Legal, ABC (Season 3, Episode 11)
 Cloak & Dagger, Freeform (Flashbacks)
 Criminal Minds (TV Series), CBS (Season 2, Episode 18)
 K-Ville, FOX (2007)
 NCIS New Orleans, CBS (Flashback)
 The Naked Brothers Band (TV series), Nickelodeon (Season 2, Episodes 26-28) ("Polar Bears")
 Treme, HBO (2010–2013)
 Without a Trace, CBS (Season 5, Episode 6)

Theater

The Hurricane Katrina Comedy Festival, by Rob Florence, premiered at the 2010 New York International Fringe Festival at SoHo Playhouse.  The cast, directed by Dann Fink and stage managed by Christina Lowe, featured Philip Hoffman, Lizann Mitchell, Maureen Silliman, Evander Duck, and Gary Cowling.  The play interweaves the stories of five individuals in New Orleans during and after Hurricane Katrina. According to Time Out New York, the play focuses "on the kind of small anecdotes you might hear from a friend in your living room: politely amusing, occasionally moving, deliberately uplifting."  The New York Times''' David Rooney compared the play's narrative approach to The Laramie Project, with the story told by each character "intertwined into a compelling chronicle,  The show extended, and was included in the New York International Fringe Festival's Encores Series, remounted at the Lucille Lortel Theatre with the original cast, director and designers reprising their roles.

SculptureKatrina'' (2005), by Rashit Suleymanov, Bronze

References

External links
Hurricane Katrina Fiction at webrary.org

Works about Hurricane Katrina